Machilipatnam, also known as Masulipatnam and Bandar, is a city in Krishna district of the Indian state of Andhra Pradesh. It is a municipal corporation and the administrative headquarters of Krishna district. It is also the mandal headquarters of Machilipatnam mandal in Machilipatnam revenue division of the district. The ancient port town served as the settlement of European traders from the 16th century, and it was a major trading port for the Portuguese, British, Dutch and French in the 17th century.

Etymology 

During the 17th century, it was known by the names Masulipatnam and Masulipatam, in local Telugu language, 'Masuli'/'Machili' means fish and 'Patnam' means city. Masula and Bandar (Bandar translates to 'port' in Persian language). The port town in the ancient times was also referred with the name Maesolia.

History 

The town has existed since at least the 3rd century BCE (Satavahana period) when, according to Ptolemy, it was known as Maisolos. The Periplus of the Erythraean Sea calls it Masalia in the 1st-century BCE. The port is on the southeastern, or Coromandel Coast, of India. At the mouth of the River Krishna on the Bay of Bengal, the Masula port saw flourishing sea trade.

Muslin was traded by ancient Greeks from the town and the word muslin originated from the name Maisolos. Muslin was an important source of income for the town, being a favourite of Roman traders for domestic consumption. Several Roman coins were found during excavations of Buddhist towns near Machilipatnam.

Masulipatnam rose to prominence under the Qutb Shahi kings. The town served as the primary sea port for their dominion, the kingdom of Golkonda. It was an outlet for textiles produced in the Godavari Delta. It was a major source of income for the kingdom, and contributed to its immense prosperity in the 1620s and 1630s.

By the end of the 17th century, the port city had fallen into decline. This coincided with the Mughal conquest of Golkonda. However, mismanagement prior to the conquest may have also been a factor in the city's decline.

The town was the district headquarters of the then, Masulipatnam district and now to the Krishna district, which was formed in 1859 in the composite Madras state.

Geography 
The city has an average elevation of 14 meters (45 feet).

Climate 
Machilipatnam (city) gets most of its annual rainfall due to the southwest monsoon. It has a tropical savanna climate (Köppen climate classification Aw) with hot summers and moderate winters. The hottest months are between April and June. The 1977 Andhra Pradesh cyclone crossed the coast near Nizampatnam and took approximately 10,000 lives. As the storm approached the coast, gale winds reaching 200 km/h lashed Prakasam, Guntur, Krishna, East Godavari and West Godavari districts. A storm surge, 5 meters high, inundated the Krishna estuary and the coast south of the city (Bandar).

On 8 December 2004, a high capacity S-Band Doppler cyclone warning radar was installed, commissioned and made operational at the city by the German manufacturer Gematronik. With the installation of the radar, it is hoped the state will be better equipped to track cyclones. The facility will monitor the 960 km long coastline of the state.

Demographics

 census, Machilipatnam had a population of 1,70,008. The total population constitutes 83,561 males and 86,447 females — a sex ratio of 1035 females per 1000 males. 13,778 children are in the age group of 0–6 years, of which 7,076 are boys and 6,702 are girls. The average literacy rate stands at 83.32% with 130,173 literates, significantly higher than the state average of 67.41%.

Governance

Civic administration 

Machilipatnam Municipal Corporation is the civic body of the city. It was constituted as a municipality in 1866 and was upgraded to corporation from special grade municipality on 9 December 2015. It covers an area of  under its jurisdiction. The present commissioner of the corporation is Sampath and the municipal chairperson is Motamarri Venkata Baba Prasad.

Machilipatnam Urban Development Authority is the urban planning authority, headquartered at Machilipatnam.

Politics 

Machilipatnam is a part of Machilipatnam (Assembly constituency) for Andhra Pradesh Legislative Assembly. Perni Venkata Ramaiah is the present MLA of the constituency from the YSR Congress Party. The assembly segment is also a part of Machilipatnam (Lok Sabha constituency), which was won by Balashowry Vallabhaneni of YSR Party.

Economy 
Machilipatnam is known for its handloom industry, which produces Kalamkari textiles exported to United States and other Asian countries.

Other notable local industries are boat building and fishing. Machilipatnam was a trading base for the Europeans in the 17th century and known for minting copper coins, exporting diamonds, textiles etc., through the port.

The AP state government is taking measures to bring back the glory of the former port city. On 7 February 2019, it has started construction of a deep seaport and associated industrial corridor under the Machilipatnam Area Development Authority.

Culture

Art and handicrafts

Machilipatnam Kalamkari is a handcrafted dyed block-painting of a fabric. It is performed at the nearby town of Pedana and was registered with geographical indication from Andhra Pradesh. Machilipatnam and Srikalahasti styles are the only existing Kalamkari style works present in India.

Dance

Kuchipudi, a popular Indian Classical Dance form, originated at Kuchipudi, 25 kilometers from Machilipatnam.

Cuisine

The city is well known for a sweet known as Bandar Laddu and Bandar Halwa.

Religious worship

There are many religions with worship centers in and around the city, such as Panduranga Temple at Chilakalapudi, Agastheeswara Temple etc. Dattashram is a pilgrimage site on the coast and home to ancient Shiva and Datta temples. Manginapudi is popularly known as "Datta Rameswaram" due to the consecration of 12 wells for bathing (recalling those at Rameswaram).

Tourism 

Manginapudi Beach is on the coast of the city. Machilipatnam also has the ruined buildings built by the Europeans who settled here.

Transport 

The National Highway 65 connects Machilipatnam to Pune via Hyderabad, Suryapet and Vijayawada. NH 216 from Kattipudi to Ongole, passes through the city.

The city's bus station is owned and operated by Andhra Pradesh State Road Transport Corporation. The station is equipped with a bus depot for storage and maintenance of buses.

Machilipatnam railway station is a 'B–Category' and 'Adarsh station' under the jurisdiction of Vijayawada railway division.

Machilipatnam port was damaged by a giant ocean wave on 1 November 1864. Since then, there were many efforts to build a new port. Navayuga Engineering Company Limited is in the process of building a deep water port at Gilakaladinne of the city.

The nearest International airport is Gannavaram, Vijayawada (63 kms).

Education 
The primary and secondary school education is imparted by government, aided, and private schools of the School Education Department of the state. Krishna University is located in Machilipatnam.

Notable natives
 Divi Gopalacharlu - Ayurvedic scholar
 Timmarusu - Prime Minister of Raja Krishnadevaraya, the emperor of Vijayanagara Empire
 Pingali Venkayya - Independence activist; designer of the national flag
 Chitrapu Narayana Murthy - Indian director known for films like AVM's Bhaktha Prahlada (1967) 
 Mutnuri Krishna Rao - Independence activist and journalist
 U. G. Krishnamurthy - Philosopher
 Bhogaraju Pattabhisitaramayya - Indian independence activist and political leader
 Raghupathi Venkaiah Naidu - father of Telugu cinema, Indian artiste and film maker
 C. K. Nayudu - Indian cricketer
 Poornima - Indian actress who starred in many Telugu, Tamil, Kannada and Malayalam films.
 Jagapathi Babu - Telugu actor.
 B. Vasantha - South Indian playback singer.
 Master Venu - Music composer of the Telugu and Tamil cinemas.
 C. S. R. Anjaneyulu - C. S. R., was an Indian film method actor, and thespian best known for his works in Telugu cinema and Telugu theater.
 Nirmalamma - Telugu actress known for her grandmother roles in old films.
 Maruthi - Indian director, screenwriter, producer who works primarily in Telugu cinema.
 Mani Sharma -  Indian composer, singer, arranger, multi-instrumentalist and music producer known for his works primarily in the Telugu and Tamil cinema along with Hindi and Kannada films.
 Achyuth - Indian actor
 Srikanth Bolla - First Indian blind boy to study at Massachusetts Institute of Technology  and an entrepreneur and founder of Bollant Industries.
 Turaga Desiraju - neurophysiologist and a professor at National Institute of Mental Health and Neurosciences

See also 
 List of cities in Andhra Pradesh
 List of municipal corporations in Andhra Pradesh

References

Bibliography

External links 

 
Cities in Andhra Pradesh
Former Portuguese colonies
Port cities in India
Populated coastal places in India
Archaeological sites in Andhra Pradesh
Mandal headquarters in Krishna district
District headquarters of Andhra Pradesh
1611 establishments in the British Empire